"16 Candles" is a 1958 song performed by The Crests and written by Luther Dixon and Allyson R. Khent.

Track listing
7" Vinyl
 "16 Candles"
 "Beside You"
Single originally released in 1958 on Coed Records #506

Chart performance
 The song peaked at #2 on the Billboard Hot 100 charts, while "Stagger Lee" by Lloyd Price was at #1.  "16 Candles" also went #4 on the US R&B charts for 21 weeks in 1959.

Covers
A cover by Jerry Lee Lewis peaked at #61 on the Billboard Hot Country Singles chart in 1986.
A cover by Stray Cats was used as the title song to the eponymous movie.
A cover by Sha Na Na was performed live and recorded on their album Golden Age of Rock'n'Roll  in 1973, Disc 3, Track 3.

References

External links
 The Crests sing 16 Candles

1958 singles
1959 singles
1986 singles
Songs written by Luther Dixon
1958 songs
Jerry Lee Lewis songs
Doo-wop songs